The 2005 Internazionali Femminili di Palermo was a professional women's tennis tournament played on outdoor clay courts. It was the 18th edition of the tournament which was part of the WTA Tier IV category of the 2005 WTA Tour. It took place in Palermo, Italy between 18 and 24 July 2005. Third-seeded Anabel Medina Garrigues won her second consecutive singles title at the event, and third in total, and earned $22,000 first-prize money.

Finals

Singles

  Anabel Medina Garrigues defeated  Klára Koukalová, 6–4, 6–0
It was the 2nd singles title of the year for Medina Garrigues and the 4th title of her career.

Doubles

  Giulia Casoni /  Mariya Koryttseva defeated  Klaudia Jans /  Alicja Rosolska, 4–6, 6–3, 7–5
It was the 3rd title for Casoni and the 1st title for Koryttseva in their respective doubles careers.

References

External links
 ITF tournament edition details
 Tournament draws

Internazionali Femminili di Palermo
Internazionali Femminili di Palermo
2005 in Italian women's sport
Torneo